Seliga is a surname. It is either Šeliga without diacritics, or a variant of Szeliga. Notable people with this surname include:

 Andrew Seliga (born 1989), American Army Captain and Cavalry leader
 Aleksander Šeliga (born 1980), Slovenian footballer
 Dariusz Seliga (born 1969), Polish politician
 Joe Seliga (1911–2005), American canoe builder

See also
 
Siliga
Suliga
Cigaritis seliga